The 45th Golden Globes Awards, honoring the best in film and television for 1987, were held on January 23, 1988 at the Beverly Hilton. The nominations were announced on January 5, 1988.

Winners and nominees

Film 

The following films received multiple nominations:

The following films received multiple awards:

Television 

The following programs received multiple nominations:

The following programs received multiple wins:

Ceremony

Presenters 

 Richard Dean Anderson
 Ann-Margret
 Richard Attenborough
 Kevin Bacon
 Corbin Bernsen
 Pam Dawber
 Sandy Duncan
 Fred Dyer
 Ann Jillian
 Lorenzo Lamas
 Marlee Matlin
 Marilyn McCoo
 Donna Mills
 Leonard Nimoy
 Jerry Orbach
 Ron Perlman
 Lou Diamond Phillips
 Christopher Reeve
 Cynthia Rhodes
 Mickey Rooney
 Katharine Ross
 Emma Samms
 Connie Sellecca
 Tom Selleck
 Ally Sheedy
 Cybill Shepherd
 Yakov Smirnoff
 Robert Wagner
 James Woods

Cecil B. DeMille Award 
Clint Eastwood

See also
60th Academy Awards
8th Golden Raspberry Awards
39th Primetime Emmy Awards
40th Primetime Emmy Awards
 41st British Academy Film Awards
 42nd Tony Awards
 1987 in film
 1987 in American television

References

045
1987 film awards
1987 television awards
January 1988 events in the United States
Golden Globe